The College of Liberal Arts of Shanghai University (上海大学文学院) is the institute of academic concentrates mainly on linguistics and liberal arts, history and sociology theory.

The college consist of department of Chinese, history, sociology, and archival science. The college awards 4 types of bachelor's degrees of literature & linguistics of Chinese, History, Sociology, Archival Science, and 3 types of master's degree of Chinese Contemporary Literature, Linguistics, History and Sociology.

The college consist of Chinese Culture Research Institute, Sociology Research Institute, Sociology of Aging Research Institute. In addition, the Social Research and Development Centre of Shanghai, of which the famous sociologist Mr. Fei Xiaotong took up the post of director, is affiliated to the College of Liberal Arts.

The famous writer, vice-president of Chinese Writers Association, Ye Xin is the college president. The sociologist Weizhi Deng is the dean of the institute of sociology. There are 101 full-time teachers in the institute, of which 58 associate professors and professors. The teachers were awarded more than 50 items of national or local prize of scientific research of social sciences at all levels. There are long-term academic exchange, cooperation with universities and academic research institutions of more than ten countries and regions.

At present the college takes on more than ten kinds of international collaborative project, the national social sciences planned project, Shanghai social sciences projects and horizontal collaborative project.

Shanghai University